Eunoe shirikishinai is a scale worm described from Hokkaido Island in the North Pacific Ocean.

Description
Number of segments 39; elytra 15 pairs. Blackish pigment. Prostomium anterior margin comprising two rounded lobes. Lateral antennae inserted ventrally (beneath prostomium and median antenna). Elytra marginal fringe of papillae present. Notochaetae about as thick as neurochaetae. Bidentate neurochaetae absent.

References

Phyllodocida